Vitaly Samoshko (Ukrainian: Віталій Самошко, Vitaliy Samoshko; born 1973 in Kharkiv) is a Ukrainian pianist. He settled in Belgium in 2001.

His first significant achievement was a 6th prize at the 1992 Sydney International Piano Competition. He was subsequently awarded 2nd prizes at the 1993 Concorso Busoni, the 1996 Concours de Montreal and the 1998 Arthur Rubinstein Competition before winning the 1999 Queen Elisabeth Competition. He has built an international concert career since.

Reference

See also 
Queen Elisabeth Music Competition

1973 births
Living people
Ukrainian classical pianists
Male classical pianists
Sydney International Piano Competition prize-winners
Prize-winners of the Ferruccio Busoni International Piano Competition
Prize-winners of the Queen Elisabeth Competition
21st-century classical pianists
21st-century male musicians
Musicians from Kharkiv